Vespertinas was an Uruguayan daytime talk show aired from 2018 to 2021. Broadcast by Channel 4, it featured a panel of three female presenters who interview public figures, discuss their lives, and discuss topical issues ranging from politics and current affairs to celebrity gossip and entertainment news.

It debuted on April 16, 2018, and ended on June 25, 2021. It was canceled due to low audience ratings and high production costs, which did not generate profit for the broadcaster. On November 15, 2019, the show aired the 400th episode.

Format 
The show consists of a talk show where a panel composed of three women discusses current informative topics, and in which the presenters debate, together with the opinion of experts, special reports and testimonials.

On-air staff

References

External links 
 

Uruguayan television series
2018 Uruguayan television series debuts
2010s Uruguayan television series
2021 Uruguayan television series endings
Canal 4 (Uruguayan TV channel) original programming